Nanjanagudu Tirumalamba (1887-1982) (also known as Nanjanagud Tirumalamba) was the earliest age Kannada author, newspaper editor, publisher, and printer who strived for the upliftment of women. She was born on March 25, 1887 , to a Brahmin family in Nanjanagudu of the erstwhile state of Mysore under British India. Her father, Venkatakrishna Iyengar, was a lawyer and her mother was Alamelamma. Like the Srivaishnavas of their time, her mother tongue was Tamil. She had a special predilection towards Kannada language which was the language of the city in which she lived. She knew Kannada, Tamil, and Telugu languages. She died in Nanjanagudu,  Mysore,  Karanataka, India on August 31, 1982.

Early life

At the custom of her time when child marriage was common, Tirumalamba was married at the age of ten. At the age of fourteen, her husband died, and she became a widow. Venkatakrishna Iyengar, her father, was a bibliophile who had a large heart, ensured that his daughter received the best of works that he read to his daughter. And so, books were their companions. Apart from Ramayana, Mahabharata, Bhagavatha, they read plays named Nanjanagudu Srikanta Shastri, Bellave Somanathayya, M. Venkatadri Shastri and others widely. Without paying heed to her tragic personal life, reinforcing her inner self with reading books, Tirumalamba walked ahead in life and relentlessly worked towards solving problems of the world.

Teacher

In her spare time, Tirumalamba started teaching children from the cross borders of her house which over a period of time became a school in itself. Not only the children, but women from her neighborhood started learning from Tirumalamba after finishing their household chores as early as possible. Thus, her home came to be known as “Mathru Mandira”. For her favorite students, Tirumalamba started a newspaper called “Sanmargadarshini”.

During the course of her studies, Tirumalmba had the habit of jotting down notes of her likings as a habit. Using the thoughts that came to her from her notes, Tirumalamba extended the range of ideas to drama, fiction, stories, and songs. Her “Mathru Mandira” always provided an endearing audience for her writings. In this direction, Tirumalmba started writing more and more to deliver the much awaited audience.

Writer

Once a monthly magazine from Mysore called “Madhuravani” organized a story competition to which Tirumalamba sent in one of her stories. The editor of “Madhuravani”, Mr K. Hanuman came looking for the writer of such a wonderful story to Tirumalamba's house. There, he saw a treasure of several such beautiful pieces of writing. He found several stories, novels, plays, essays and a variety of articles in that house. He got influenced by a writing named “Vidhava Kartavya” and published the same in “ Madhuravani”. In times of untouchable society where child marriage was rampant, and widowed women were secluded,  Tirumalamba received criticisms from a lot of her counterparts. Undeterred in her precedent,  Tirumalamba continued to do what she felt was right with confidence. To all of this,  Tirumalamba had the blessings and best wishes of her father. In the near future,  Tirumalamba started writing “Sathi Hitaishini”, a publication house.

Publisher

Tirumalamba started her own publishing house.  From the publication house of “Sathi Hitaishini”,  Tirumalamba's first novel “Sushile” was published on 1913. The book was so popular within a short time that it saw four editions, and sold more than 7000 copies.

The “Sathi Hitaishini” publication house did not only publish Tirumalamba's novels alone but superior books such as “Sanmarga Granthavali”, “Sanmarga Grantha Malika”, “Nandini Granthamala”, (by Panyam Sundarashastri, Saraguru Venkata Varadacharya respectively), book that spoke about aims, and features called “Science of Decoration” (by Dr. S. N. Narasimhayya), books called “Suksmayurveda Chikitsa Prayoga”, “Sarala Unipathi Chikisakata” (by Dr. Srinivas Murthy) were published. Tirumalamba possessed such a great attitude. During 1913-16 Tirumalamba's eleven books including “Nabha”, “Vidyullatha”, “Harina” were published. Not excluding stories, novels, short novels, detective novels, essays, poems, plays, the total number of books that Tirumalamba wrote was approximately 28. 1939 saw Tirumalamba write her last novel titled “ManiMala”.

Newspaper Editor

Next, Tirumalamba started a monthly magazine called “Karnataka Nandini”. “I am a common woman with very less cognition who did not know the scent of knowledge. I do not have the sophistication of the urban civilization nor do I have a clue about the knowledge that the urban people seemed to possess, however, I do want to help the sorority as much as possible which is the idea that I cannot let go” were the words uttered by Tirumalamba who gave this special gift of monthly magazine to the woman kind. One of the writers who sent a poem to be published in “Karnataka Nandini” who died in the whirlpool was Udupi TulasiBai. Kademgodlu Shankara Bhattaru regularly sent some of his works to “Karnataka Nandini”. Within the magazine, there was a column called “Kannada Rannagannadi” which was reserved for people who fought for Kannada.  Tirumalamba invited educated women to contribute to “Karnataka Nandini”. Since there were very few writers whom you could count on your fingers,  Tirumalamba herself assumed different pen names to fill the columns of the magazine. Owing to which,  Tirumalamba could not sustain the magazine and had to shut down the magazine.

Death and legacy

In the meantime, her father's death shocked Tirumalamba immensely. Thus she turned more and more introverted and set her attention philosophical writing. Unable to write more, Tirumalamba's mind returned to silence.

At the age of ninety five years on 31 August 1982, Tirumalamba died.

Awards, Honours, Reception

Literary works that came out of the publication house “Sati hitaisini” such as “Matrunandini”, “Chandravadana”, “Ramanand” received prize from the Madras School Book and Literature Society. Karnataka's Vidyavardhaka Sangha honored the works “Ramananda” and “Purnakala”. Mysore, Madras, Bombay governments rewarded several works of Tirumalamba. In the year 1980, the Rajya Sahitya Academy honored Tirumalamba.

Since 1917 for almost two decades, Tirumalamba's works became text books in schools of Madras, Mysore, and Bombay states.

Tirumalamba Award

To immortalize Tirumalamba, C. N. Mangala founded the “Shaswathi” institution that confers “  Tirumalamba Award” to one of the good woman writers.

Works

Novels

 Sushile
 Nabha
 Vidyullata
 Viragini
 Daksakanye (spy)
 Manimala

Drama

 Savitri Charitre
 Janaki Kalyana

See also

Indian literature
List of Indian writers
List of Indian women writers

References

1887 births
1982 deaths
Kannada people
Writers from Mysore
Indian women poets
Kannada poets
20th-century Indian poets
20th-century Indian women writers
Indian women journalists
Indian women editors
Indian editors
Poets from Karnataka
Journalists from Karnataka
Indian women publishers
Indian publishers (people)
Indian printers
Businesspeople from Mysore
19th-century Indian women
19th-century Indian people
20th-century Indian businesspeople
20th-century publishers (people)
20th-century Indian journalists
Kannada-language journalists
Women writers from Karnataka
Businesswomen from Karnataka
20th-century Indian businesswomen